Ana María Torres Ramírez (born 25 January 1980), also known as La Guerrera, is a Mexican former professional boxer who competed from 1999 to 2012. She held the WBC female super flyweight title twice between 2007 and 2012, and challenged once for the WBC female bantamweight title in 2006.

Professional career

Torres began to train as a boxer with José Morales, father of Erik "El Terrible" Morales, and debuted professionally on 3 July 1999 at Mexico City's Arena México, where she defeated Mariana Juárez in the fourth round.

She conquered the vacant Mexican bantamweight title on 26 June 2002 in a rematch against Juárez. This time, the bout was held at Salón 21, in Polanco, and ended after ten rounds with a unanimous decision favouring Torres. She held the title until 13 February 2004, when she lost against Ivonne Muñoz in a match held at the municipal auditorium of Mexicali, Baja California.

Professional boxing record

References

1980 births
Living people
People from Nezahualcóyotl
Boxers from the State of Mexico
Super-flyweight boxers
Mexican women boxers
World Boxing Council champions